The 51st Troop Carrier Squadron is an inactive United States Air Force unit.  Its last assignment was with the Naples Air Force General Depot at Ciampino Airport, Italy, where it was inactivated on 9 March 1946.  The squadron was activated in the spring of 1942 as the 51st Transport Squadron, when the 62d Transport Group expanded from  three to four squadrons.  After training in the United States, the squadron moved briefly to England, then to the Mediterranean Theater of Operations, where it served until V-E Day.  It remained in Italy after the war until inactivating.

History
Activated in June 1942 as a I Troop Carrier Command Douglas C-47 Skytrain troop carrier squadron, trained in the United States until being deployed to England.  Assigned to VIII Air Support Command, Eighth Air Force in October 1942.

Trained briefly in England until the Operation Torch landings in North Africa during November 1942.   Was reassigned to Twelfth Air Force and moved to Tafaraoui Airfield, Algeria on 15 November 1942.  The squadron's aircraft flew supplies to front-line units in Algeria and Tunisia during the North African Campaign as soon as suitable landing strips were available and evacuated casualties back to rear area field hospitals.

Squadron engaged in combat operations, dropping airborne units into Sicily during Operation Husky invasion and later into areas around Anzio, Italy as part of Operation Shingle, the invasion of mainland Italy and the initiation of the Italian Campaign, January 1944.  Moved north through Italy, 1944-1945 in support of Allied ground forces, evacuated wounded personnel and flew missions behind enemy lines in Italy and the Balkans to haul guns, ammunition, food, clothing, medical supplies, and other materials to the partisans and to drop propaganda leaflets.

Participated in the airborne assault of Southern France, August 1944, dropping airborne forces into the Rhone Valley.  With the end of combat in May, 1945, aided in the redeployment of personnel after the war and also hauled freight and mail.  Personnel demobilized in Italy on 14 November 1945 and placed in non-operational status, inactivated as an administrative unit in March 1946.

Campaigns
 Tunisia; Sicily; Naples-Foggia; Rome-Amo; Southern France; North Apennines; Po Valley; Air Combat, EAME Theater.

=Lineage
 Constituted as the 51st Transport Squadron on 30 May 1942
 Activated on 1 June 1942
 Re-designated 51st Troop Carrier Squadron on 4 July 1942
 Inactivated on 9 March 1946

Assignments
 62d Transport Group (later 62d Troop Carrier) Group]], 1 June 1942
 Naples Air Force General Depot, 14 November 1945 – 9 March 1946 (nonoperational after 14 November 1945)

Stations

 Kellogg Field, Michigan, 1 Jun 1942
 Florence Army Air Field, South Carolina, 1 Jul-14 Aug 1942;
 RAF Keevil (AAF-471),> England, 10 Oct 1942
 Tafaraoui Airfield, Algeria, 15 November 1942
 Nouvion Airfield, Algeria, 24 December 1942
 Matemore Airfield, Algeria, 16 May 1943
 Goubrine Airfield, Tunisia, 2 July 1943
 Ponte Olivo Airfield, Sicily, 6 September 1943

 Brindisi Airfield, Italy, February 1944
 Galera Airfield, Italy, 30 June 1944
 Malignano Airfield, Italy, 30 September 1944
 Tarquinia Airfield, Italy, 8 January 1945
 Rosignano Airfield, Italy, 25 May 1945
 Capodichino Airport, Italy, 6 Oct 1945
 Naples, Italy, 6 February-9 March 1946

Aircraft
 Douglas C-47 Skytrain, 1942-1946

References

Notes

Bibliography

External links 

Military units and formations established in 1942
051